St Paul's School may refer to:

Australia
St Paul's Anglican School, Bald Hills, in Brisbane, Australia

Brazil
St Paul's School, Brazil

Canada
St. Paul's High School (Winnipeg), Manitoba
École St. Paul School, a Catholic school in North Park, Saskatoon

Ghana
St. Paul's Senior High School, formerly St. Paul's Secondary School, Hatsukope

Hong Kong
St. Paul's Convent School, in Causeway Bay
St. Paul's Co-educational College, in the Mid Levels
St. Paul's College, Hong Kong, in Bonham Road, Western Mid-Levels
St. Paul's Primary Catholic School, a Grade II historic building in Happy Valley, Hong Kong

India
St. Paul's School, Darjeeling, Darjeeling
St Paul's School, Agartala, Tripura
St. Paul's School, New Delhi, New Delhi
St. Paul's Senior Secondary School, Palampur, Himachal Pradesh
St Paul's School, Rourkela, Odisha
St. Paul's Higher Secondary School, Vepery, Chennai, Tamil Nadu
St Paul's Higher Secondary School, Ujjain, Madhya Pradesh
St. Paul's School, Gwalior,  Madhya Pradesh

Malaysia
St. Paul's Institution, Seremban

New Zealand
St. Paul's School, Dallington in Dallington, New Zealand
St Paul's School, Wellington, which later became Thorndon School
St Paul's Collegiate School in Hamilton, New Zealand
St Paul's Catholic School, Waikato in Ngāruawāhia

Pakistan
St Paul's English High School, Karachi

Philippines
Saint Paul School of San Antonio, Nueva Ecija

United Kingdom
St Paul's School, London, independent school for boys aged 13–18 (originally in the City of London, now in Barnes)
St Paul's Cathedral School, independent school for boys aged 4–13 (near St Paul's Cathedral, London)
St Paul's Girls' School, independent school in Hammersmith, London 
St Paul's School for Girls, Birmingham, a state-funded school for girls in Edgbaston, Birmingham, UK

St Paul's Catholic School, Leicester, Evington, Leicester
St Paul's Catholic School, Milton Keynes

United States

St. Paul's School (Louisiana)
St. Paul's School for Boys (Maryland), an Episcopal private school located in Brooklandville, Maryland
St. Paul's School for Girls (Maryland), an independent college-preparatory school in Brooklandville, Maryland
St. Paul's School (New Hampshire)
St. Paul's School (New Jersey)
St. Paul's School (New York)
St. Paul's School (Virginia), a historic Rosenwald school building
St. Paul's Episcopal School in Mobile, Alabama
St. Paul's Lutheran School in East Northport, New York

See also
St. Paul's School for Girls (disambiguation)
Saint Paul's College (disambiguation)
St. Paul High School (disambiguation)
St. Paul's High School (disambiguation)
St. Paul's Primary School (disambiguation)
St. Paul (disambiguation)